ČSV is an initialism used to promote Sámi identity and activism.

History 
In the early 1970s, Sámi activists adopted ČSV as a watchword similar to how the American Indian Movement and the Black Panthers used the phrases "Red Power" and "Black Power" respectively. ČSV did not represent a group, but more of an idea that minority groups should take a more confrontational stance in demanding change.

Although the phrase originated among the Northern Sámi community in Finnmark, Norway, it soon spread across Sápmi and to other Sámi language groups.

In general, someone who works actively to support the Sámi community has been referred to a ČSV. As an ethnocultural movement, ČSV has been associated with a certain style, including wearing gáktis, nutukas, tin-thread embroidery, and the Sami colors, as one the goals of ČSV is to make Sámi culture and identity visible.

Artists 
While the origin of ČSV was political, it soon became a cultural identifier drawing the attention of authors and artists. In 1972, participants at a Sirma, Norway, cultural seminar to promote Sámi literature were tasked with writing what ČSV meant for them as part of an exercise to encourage Sámi to write about Sámi experiences. The literary anthology  launched out of this seminar, publishing 16 issues and featuring many first-time Sámi authors. A number of issues of  featured poems with words containing the letters ČSV.

In 2013, Kildin Sámi photographer Sergey Gavrilov asked Sámi youth to repeat the ČSV exercise for an exhibition at the Sami Center for Contemporary Art in Kárášjohka, Norway. In 2014, the play  explored the idea of a unified, independent Sápmi and how different Sámi communities and languages might engage with one another and the world.

Interpretation 
Expressing the meaning of ČSV for many is an exercise in creativity, demonstrating the adaptability of the Sámi people and languages. Common meanings include:
  (Show Sámi Spirit!)
  (Sámi Unite for Victory!)
  (Write, Sámi friends!)

References 

Initialisms
Scandinavia
Sámi
Sámi-language terms
Sámi politics
Indigenous rights